Dorothy Walker (16 January 1929 – 8 December 2002) was an Irish art critic and a vocal champion of abstract modernism in Ireland.

Life and career
Born Dorothy Cole in Dublin in 1929 to the owner of a fruit and vegetable business, living in Mountjoy Square, Dublin, and educated in the Dominican Convent Wicklow and École du Louvre in Paris she was a co-founder of the occasion modern art exhibition Rosc and a board member and even an interim director of the Irish Museum of Modern Art. She was married to architect Robin Walker with whom she had five children. After her death the museum held an exhibition in her honour, featuring work by artists, such as Patrick Scott and Sean Scully who she particularly favoured. Her books include a rare but much admired discussion of contemporary Irish art.

Bibliography
 (1997) Modern art in Ireland. Dublin: Liliput, 
 Michael Scott, Architect in (casual) conversation with Dorothy Walker (Kinsale: Gandon Editions 1995)
 Without the Walls: John Aiken, James Coleman, Felim Egan, Brian King, Ciaran Lennon, Alanna O'Kelly, Michael O’Sullivan, Nigel Rolfe, Noel Sheridan [ICA Main Gallery, The Mall, London SW1, 16 Feb.-16 March 1980; A Sense of Ireland Ser.] (London: ICA 1980)

References

Sources
 Caoimhín Mac Giolla Léith (2003) Dorothy Walker 1929-2002. CIRCA 103.

Irish art critics
1929 births
2002 deaths